Rupa Rani Ramkali is a Hindi action movie of Bollywood directed by K.I. Shaikh and produced by Kamal Nayar. This film was released on 23 March 2001 under the banner of Millennium 2000 Films.

Plot
This is a revenge story of Ramkali, a dancer turned bandit.

Cast
 Kiran Kumar
 Sadashiv Amrapurkar as Zamindar Rasikalal Rasia
 Mohan Joshi as Daku Gujjar Singh
 Gajendra Chauhan
 Jack Gaud as Daroga Bhimsen
 Sapna
 Anil Nagrath
 Kirti Shetty
 Vinod Tripathi
 Brij Gopal
 Amit Pachori

References

External links
 

2001 films
2000s Hindi-language films
Indian action films
Indian rape and revenge films
Films about outlaws
Indian films about revenge
2001 action films
Hindi-language action films